George Cassety Pendleton (April 23, 1845 – January 19, 1913) was a Democratic politician who served as Texas State Representative and Speaker, Lieutenant Governor of Texas, and U.S. Representative from the 7th District of Texas.

Early life and service in the Civil War
Pendleton was born to Ned E. and Sarah (Smart) Pendleton near Viola in Warren County, Tennessee. In 1857, the family moved to Ellis County, Texas. Pendleton enlisted as a private in the Confederate Army after the beginning of the Civil War and saw action with the Nineteenth Texas Cavalry in the Trans-Mississippi Department. After the war he returned to Texas and enrolled in Waxahachie Academy, but was forced by illness to withdraw. In an effort to regain his strength through work, Pendleton accepted a job as a traveling salesman for a Dallas implement company. He remained with the firm for ten years. In 1870, he married Helen Embree of Belton, Texas. The couple raised five children. During 1881 and 1882 Pendleton lived in Bell County, Texas, first in Old Howard, and later, after the Santa Fe Railroad bypassed that village, at Pendleton, where he was involved in various business pursuits for a short time. His experiences as a farmer apparently drew him to the activities of the Grange for a time. In 1882 he moved to Temple, where he entered the land abstract and title firm of his brother-in-law, William E. Hill, and A. M. Monteith.

Political career
Pendleton was a delegate to every Democratic State convention from 1876 to 1910. Pendleton was selected as state representative of the Twenty-fourth District, which included Bell County, and retained office for the Eighteenth, Nineteenth, and Twentieth legislatures; he served as Speaker of the House in 1887–1889. Between 1883 and 1889, while a member of the state legislature, he held a number of positions within the state's Democratic Party, including chairman pro tem of both the antiprohibition state convention of May 1887 and the state convention in 1888. The 1890 Democratic state convention, cognizant of Pendleton's Granger past, nominated him as gubernatorial candidate James S. Hogg's running mate on a platform designed to appeal to the state's agrarian voters during this period of farmer activism. Following Hogg's victory Pendleton served as Lieutenant Governor of Texas from 1891 through 1893 under Governor James S. Hogg. In 1892 he successfully sought election to Congress from the state's Seventh District, which included Bell, Falls, McLennan, Freestone, Limestone, Milam, Brazos, and Robertson counties. He served two terms in Washington and was a delegate to the Democratic National Convention in Chicago in 1896.

Life after Congress
After returning to Temple in 1897, Pendleton entered banking and studied law in his spare time. He was admitted to the bar in 1900 and practiced law until his death. He also remained active in Democratic politics during his later years, serving as a chairman pro tem of the state convention in 1902 and holding a seat on the committee on platform and resolutions in 1904. In the latter position he presented a minority report that encouraged state control over interstate corporations operating in Texas. He also called for an investigation of Senator Joseph W. Bailey's relationship with the Standard Oil Company. After the election of Woodrow Wilson to the presidency in 1912, Pendleton was to be appointed Postmaster of Temple, a post no doubt intended as a reward for his long service to the Democratic party. The appointment was never made, however, for he died on January 19, 1913, after suffering a stroke. He was buried in Hillcrest Cemetery in Temple.

References

External links

1845 births
1913 deaths
People of Texas in the American Civil War
Democratic Party members of the Texas House of Representatives
Speakers of the Texas House of Representatives
Lieutenant Governors of Texas
Democratic Party members of the United States House of Representatives from Texas
19th-century American politicians